The butterfly barb (Enteromius hulstaerti) is a species of cyprinid fish in the genus Enteromius.

The fish is named in honor of Révérend Père Gustaaf Hulstaert (1900-1990), an entomologist, botanist and missionary in the Belgian Congo, who collected the type specimen.

References 

Enteromius
Cyprinid fish of Africa
Taxa named by Max Poll
Fish described in 1945